Carrol Wilfred Delaney (May 20, 1909 – June 25, 1971) was a farmer, fur rancher, businessperson and political figure on Prince Edward Island. He represented 5th Prince in the Legislative Assembly of Prince Edward Island from 1947 to 1951 as a Liberal.

He was born in Summerside, Prince Edward Island, the son of Dr. Mark Delaney and Mary Cosgrove. He was married twice: to Josephine Arsenault in 1930 and later to Alice Toombs. Delaney served on the town council for Summerside. He raised fox and mink for fur and grew potatoes. Delaney was also a ticketing agent for the Canadian National Railway and owned a construction and trucking company. He ran unsuccessfully for a seat in the provincial assembly in a 1946 by-election, losing to Francis J. MacNeill. Delaney defeated MacNeill in the 1947 general election. He later moved to Hunter River, where he died at the age of 62.

References
 

Prince Edward Island Liberal Party MLAs
1909 births
1971 deaths
People from Summerside, Prince Edward Island